Donna Tanoue (born May 5, 1954) served as the 17th chairperson of the U.S. Federal Deposit Insurance Corporation (FDIC) from May 26, 1998, until July 11, 2001. Subsequently, in April 2002, she became Vice chairperson and Managing Committee member of the Bank of Hawaii.

As FDIC Chairperson, Tanoue focused attention on emerging risks in the financial institution industry, and especially on the risks that arise from subprime lending. Investigating fraud at banks was prioritized for FDIC examiners, because recent changes in the business of banking and innovations in computer technology had created greater opportunity for financial irregularities. And the FDIC also refined its system of setting deposit insurance premiums in an attempt to capture more accurately the risks that institutions posed to its insurance funds.

Tanoue's FDIC took an aggressive approach to supervising federally insured financial institutions to ensure their readiness for the Year 2000 date change. Tanoue personally appeared on network television news programs to describe the banking industry’s preparedness for Year 2000, assuring the public that there would be no significant disruptions in the banking system because of Y2K.

Before she became FDIC Chairman, Tanoue was a partner in the Hawaii law firm of Goodsill Anderson Quinn & Stifel, which she joined in 1987. She specialized in banking, real estate finance, and governmental affairs.

From 1983 to 1987, Tanoue was Commissioner of Financial Institutions for the State of Hawaii. In that post, she was the primary state regulator for state-chartered banks, savings and loan associations, trust companies, industrial loan companies, credit unions, and escrow depository companies. Tanoue also served as Special Deputy Attorney General to the Department of Commerce and Consumer Affairs for the State of Hawaii from 1981 to 1983.

Tanoue received a J.D. from the Georgetown University Law Center in 1981 and a B.A. from the University of Hawaii in 1977.

Her husband, Kirk Caldwell, was Mayor of Honolulu from 2013 to 2021.

References

External links
FDIC press release on Tanoue's swearing-in
FDIC press release on Tanoue's resignation
Biographical information from the FDIC's 1999 Annual Report

Living people
1954 births
Chairs of the Federal Deposit Insurance Corporation
State cabinet secretaries of Hawaii
Hawaii lawyers
Hawaii people of Japanese descent
University of Hawaiʻi alumni
Georgetown University Law Center alumni
People from Honolulu
American women lawyers
Chairwomen
Chairpersons of non-governmental organizations
First ladies and gentlemen of Honolulu
Clinton administration personnel
George W. Bush administration personnel
21st-century American women